First Presbyterian Church and Churchyard is a historic  Presbyterian church on New Street between Middle and Hancock Streets in New Bern, Craven County, North Carolina.  It was built in 1820, and is a rectangular frame church building with two tiers of windows.  It features a tetrastyle pedimented Ionic order portico and projecting four stage tower topped by an arcaded octagonal belfry. During the Civil War, the church was converted into a military hospital by the Union forces.

It was listed on the National Register of Historic Places in 1972.

References

External links

Historic American Buildings Survey in North Carolina
Presbyterian churches in North Carolina
Churches in New Bern, North Carolina
Churches on the National Register of Historic Places in North Carolina
Churches completed in 1820
19th-century Presbyterian church buildings in the United States
National Register of Historic Places in Craven County, North Carolina